Moscow City Duma District 27 is one of 45 constituencies in Moscow City Duma. The constituency has covered parts of Southern Moscow since 2014. From 1993-2005 District 27 was based in South-Western Moscow; however, after the number of constituencies was reduced to 15 in 2005, the constituency was eliminated.

Members elected

Election results

2001

|-
! colspan=2 style="background-color:#E9E9E9;text-align:left;vertical-align:top;" |Candidate
! style="background-color:#E9E9E9;text-align:left;vertical-align:top;" |Party
! style="background-color:#E9E9E9;text-align:right;" |Votes
! style="background-color:#E9E9E9;text-align:right;" |%
|-
|style="background-color:"|
|align=left|Vladimir Gruzdev
|align=left|Independent
|
|53.17%
|-
|style="background-color:"|
|align=left|Andrey Shirokov (incumbent)
|align=left|Independent
|
|16.53%
|-
|style="background-color:"|
|align=left|Georgy Buslavin
|align=left|Yabloko
|
|13.45%
|-
|style="background-color:"|
|align=left|Gennady Shirokov
|align=left|Independent
|
|3.03%
|-
|style="background-color:#000000"|
|colspan=2 |against all
|
|11.67%
|-
| colspan="5" style="background-color:#E9E9E9;"|
|- style="font-weight:bold"
| colspan="3" style="text-align:left;" | Total
| 
| 100%
|-
| colspan="5" style="background-color:#E9E9E9;"|
|- style="font-weight:bold"
| colspan="4" |Source:
|
|}

2004

|-
! colspan=2 style="background-color:#E9E9E9;text-align:left;vertical-align:top;" |Candidate
! style="background-color:#E9E9E9;text-align:left;vertical-align:top;" |Party
! style="background-color:#E9E9E9;text-align:right;" |Votes
! style="background-color:#E9E9E9;text-align:right;" |%
|-
|style="background-color:"|
|align=left|Aleksandr Semennikov
|align=left|United Russia
|
|48.24%
|-
|style="background-color:"|
|align=left|Gennady Shirokov
|align=left|Independent
|
|13.85%
|-
|style="background-color:"|
|align=left|Igor Dyakov
|align=left|Liberal Democratic Party
|
|8.25%
|-
|style="background-color:#000000"|
|colspan=2 |against all
|
|27.24%
|-
| colspan="5" style="background-color:#E9E9E9;"|
|- style="font-weight:bold"
| colspan="3" style="text-align:left;" | Total
| 
| 100%
|-
| colspan="5" style="background-color:#E9E9E9;"|
|- style="font-weight:bold"
| colspan="4" |Source:
|
|}

2014

|-
! colspan=2 style="background-color:#E9E9E9;text-align:left;vertical-align:top;" |Candidate
! style="background-color:#E9E9E9;text-align:left;vertical-align:top;" |Party
! style="background-color:#E9E9E9;text-align:right;" |Votes
! style="background-color:#E9E9E9;text-align:right;" |%
|-
|style="background-color:"|
|align=left|Stepan Orlov (incumbent)
|align=left|United Russia
|
|69.28%
|-
|style="background-color:"|
|align=left|Aleksey Dobrovolsky
|align=left|Communist Party
|
|14.67%
|-
|style="background-color:"|
|align=left|Viktor Gogolev
|align=left|Independent
|
|7.50%
|-
|style="background-color:"|
|align=left|Olga Shcherbakova
|align=left|Liberal Democratic Party
|
|4.95%
|-
| colspan="5" style="background-color:#E9E9E9;"|
|- style="font-weight:bold"
| colspan="3" style="text-align:left;" | Total
| 
| 100%
|-
| colspan="5" style="background-color:#E9E9E9;"|
|- style="font-weight:bold"
| colspan="4" |Source:
|
|}

2019

|-
! colspan=2 style="background-color:#E9E9E9;text-align:left;vertical-align:top;" |Candidate
! style="background-color:#E9E9E9;text-align:left;vertical-align:top;" |Party
! style="background-color:#E9E9E9;text-align:right;" |Votes
! style="background-color:#E9E9E9;text-align:right;" |%
|-
|style="background-color:"|
|align=left|Stepan Orlov (incumbent)
|align=left|Independent
|
|41.26%
|-
|style="background-color:"|
|align=left|Aleksey Dryga
|align=left|Communist Party
|
|35.20%
|-
|style="background-color:"|
|align=left|Sergey Korovin
|align=left|Liberal Democratic Party
|
|7.28%
|-
|style="background-color:"|
|align=left|Sergey Yerokhov
|align=left|A Just Russia
|
|6.37%
|-
|style="background-color:"|
|align=left|Viktor Gogolev
|align=left|Communists of Russia
|
|6.24%
|-
| colspan="5" style="background-color:#E9E9E9;"|
|- style="font-weight:bold"
| colspan="3" style="text-align:left;" | Total
| 
| 100%
|-
| colspan="5" style="background-color:#E9E9E9;"|
|- style="font-weight:bold"
| colspan="4" |Source:
|
|}

Notes

References

Moscow City Duma districts